A sling blade or kaiser blade is a heavy, hooked, steel blade at the end of a long (around ) handle that is usually made of wood. The blade is double-edged, and both sides are usually kept sharp. It is used to cut brush, briar, and undergrowth. Other common names for the tool are bush knife, ditch bank blade, briar axe, and surveyor's brush axe. On the East Coast of the United States some farmers call it a bush axe. The Plover, Wisconsin dialect refers to it as a ditch witch. Also historically used as a wildland firefighting tool to cut fireline, known as a brush hook.  It is also sometimes referred to as a bush hook in south eastern North Carolina. Its use in wildland fire has been substantially superseded by the chainsaw.

In popular culture
In the movie Sling Blade, Karl Childers (Billy Bob Thornton), the main character, recounts an incident from his childhood in which he killed his mother and her paramour with this tool. Childers describes it as, "Some folks call it a sling blade, I call it a kaiser blade. It's kinda got a long wooden handle, kind of like an axe handle. With a long blade on it shaped kinda like a bananer. Mhm. Sharp on one edge, and dull on the other. Mhm. It's what the highway boys use to cut down weeds and whatnot."
In the novel Red Rising, Helldivers are equipped with sling blades intended to sever their limbs if caught in machinery. The protagonist, Darrow, later acquires a sling blade during a training game. After breaking the rules of the game and attacking the proctors, he becomes known as "The Reaper" with the sling blade as his sigil.

See also
 Brush hook
 Billhook
 Bill (weapon)

References

Gardening tools
Cutting tools